The Champions League of Darts, also known as the Paddy Power Champions League of Darts for sponsorship purposes, was an annual non-ranking darts tournament organised by the Professional Darts Corporation. Featuring just the top eight players in the PDC, it was played over two days in a group stage, and then knockout format and was the smallest of the PDC's televised premier events.

It was first held in September 2016 at the Motorpoint Arena in Cardiff, the inaugural champion was Phil Taylor. The next two were then won by Mensur Suljović and Gary Anderson, before the final champion was Michael van Gerwen in 2019. Following the cancellation of the 2020 tournament, owing to the COVID-19 pandemic, the tournament was quietly shelved by the PDC.

The tournament was the first PDC event to be broadcast on the BBC.

History
The details of the inaugural tournament were announced by the PDC on 9 February 2016, in conjunction with the announcement of a new broadcasting deal between the PDC and the BBC. With the PDC 2016 calendar having already been announced in August 2015, a Barnsley round of the PDC Player Championship was moved to accommodate it. A second Champions League tournament was duly announced as part of the August 2016 release of the 2017 calendar. A further two editions were held, before the fifth edition, which was due to be held in 2020, was cancelled as a result of the COVID-19 pandemic. The tournament was subsequently shelved by the PDC. 

In addition to the prize money allocated to players, the tournament was known for a £100,000 cash prize given to the crowd in the event of a nine-dart finish. This prize was believed to be the biggest crowd prize in world sport.

Eligibility
Only the top eight players on the PDC Order of Merit qualified for the inaugural tournament, signifying the best eight players in the PDC (in 2016 based on the order following the World Matchplay in July). Starting with 2017, the reigning champion was given a guaranteed slot, meaning only the top seven and the champion would qualify if the champion was not in the top eight.

Format
The tournament format is a group stage followed by a knockout stage. The group stage features two groups of four, who meet each other in a round-robin format, i.e. each player playing their group opponents once in a single match. The best two players in each group advance to the semi-finals, the winners meeting in the final. There is no third place play-off. Matches in the group stage are won by the first player to win 10 legs (best of 19), while the knockout stages are first to 11 (best of 21).

Champions League of Darts finals

Records and statistics

Total finalist appearances

 Active players are shown in bold

High averages

Broadcaster
The tournament was the first PDC event to be broadcast on the BBC, after they ended their contract to broadcast rights of the BDO World Darts Championship.

Sponsorship
In 2016 and 2017, the title sponsor of the tournament was bookmaker Unibet, who for the 2016 season were the pre-existing sponsors of the PDC's Masters and European Championship, and the new sponsor of the PDC's World Grand Prix.
Since 2018 the tournament has been sponsored by bookmaker Paddy Power.

References

External links
 Champions League of Darts on Darts Database

 
Professional Darts Corporation tournaments
Sports competitions in Cardiff
Recurring sporting events established in 2016
Recurring sporting events disestablished in 2019
Autumn events in Wales
2016 establishments in Wales
2019 disestablishments in England
Annual sporting events in the United Kingdom